Zandor Nilsson (July 2, 1913, Stockholm – July 1, 1973, Stockholm) was a Sweden chess player, who two times won Swedish Chess Championship.

Biography
In 1957 Zandor Nilsson won Swedish Chess Championship in Stockholm. In 1965 he repeated this success in Falköping.

Zandor Nilsson has played for Sweden in seven Chess Olympiads and won individual bronze medal in 1958:
 In 1954, at reserve board in the 11th Chess Olympiad in Amsterdam (+5 −6 =2);
 In 1958, at fourth board in the 13th Chess Olympiad in Munich (+10 −4 =2);
 In 1960, at fourth board in the 14th Chess Olympiad in Leipzig (+10 −3 =3);
 In 1962, at third board in the 15th Chess Olympiad in Varna (+4 −6 =3);
 In 1964, at fourth board in the 16th Chess Olympiad in Tel Aviv (+7 −4 =2);
 In 1966, at second board in the 17th Chess Olympiad in Havana (+6 −9 =1);
 In 1968, at second board in the 18th Chess Olympiad in Lugano (+3 −5 =3).

In 1962 Zandor Nilsson has played for Sweden in World Student Team Chess Championship. In 1970 Zandor Nilsson has played for Sweden in Nordic Chess Cup. He won team silver medal and individual gold medal.

Nilsson is also known as a successful correspondence chess player. He was awarded the ICCF International Correspondence Chess Master (IMC) title in 1961.

References

External links
 
 
 

1913 births
1973 deaths
Sportspeople from Stockholm
Swedish chess players
Chess Olympiad competitors
20th-century chess players